Cities and towns under the oblast's jurisdiction:
Volgograd (Волгоград) (administrative center)
city districts:
Dzerzhinsky (Дзержинский)
Kirovsky (Кировский)
Krasnoarmeysky (Красноармейский)
Krasnooktyabrsky (Краснооктябрьский)
Sovetsky (Советский)
Traktorozavodsky (Тракторозаводский)
Tsentralny (Центральный)
Voroshilovsky (Ворошиловский)
Frolovo (Фролово)
Kamyshin (Камышин)
Mikhaylovka (Михайловка)
Urban-type settlements under the town's jurisdiction:
Sebrovo (Себрово)
Uryupinsk (Урюпинск)
Volzhsky (Волжский)
Districts:
Alexeyevsky (Алексеевский)
with 16 selsovets under the district's jurisdiction.
Bykovsky (Быковский)
Urban-type settlements under the district's jurisdiction:
Bykovo (Быково)
with 13 selsovets under the district's jurisdiction.
Chernyshkovsky (Чернышковский)
Urban-type settlements under the district's jurisdiction:
Chernyshkovsky (Чернышковский)
with 11 selsovets under the district's jurisdiction.
Danilovsky (Даниловский)
Urban-type settlements under the district's jurisdiction:
Danilovka (Даниловка)
with 11 selsovets under the district's jurisdiction.
Dubovsky (Дубовский)
Towns under the district's jurisdiction:
Dubovka (Дубовка)
with 14 selsovets under the district's jurisdiction.
Frolovsky (Фроловский)
with 13 selsovets under the district's jurisdiction.
Gorodishchensky (Городищенский)
Urban-type settlements under the district's jurisdiction:
Gorodishche (Городище)
Novy Rogachik (Новый Рогачик)
Yerzovka (Ерзовка)
with 15 selsovets under the district's jurisdiction.
Ilovlinsky (Иловлинский)
Urban-type settlements under the district's jurisdiction:
Ilovlya (Иловля)
with 14 selsovets under the district's jurisdiction.
Kalachyovsky (Калачёвский)
Towns under the district's jurisdiction:
Kalach-na-Donu (Калач-на-Дону)
with 12 selsovets under the district's jurisdiction.
Kamyshinsky (Камышинский)
Towns under the district's jurisdiction:
Petrov Val (Петров Вал)
with 20 selsovets under the district's jurisdiction.
Kikvidzensky (Киквидзенский)
with 12 selsovets under the district's jurisdiction.
Kletsky (Клетский)
with 10 selsovets under the district's jurisdiction.
Kotelnikovsky (Котельниковский)
Towns under the district's jurisdiction:
Kotelnikovo (Котельниково)
with 15 selsovets under the district's jurisdiction.
Kotovsky (Котовский)
Towns under the district's jurisdiction:
Kotovo (Котово)
with 11 selsovets under the district's jurisdiction.
Kumylzhensky (Кумылженский)
with 17 selsovets under the district's jurisdiction.
Leninsky (Ленинский)
Towns under the district's jurisdiction:
Leninsk (Ленинск)
with 12 selsovets under the district's jurisdiction.
Mikhaylovsky (Михайловский)
with 15 selsovets under the district's jurisdiction.
Nekhayevsky (Нехаевский)
with 14 selsovets under the district's jurisdiction.
Nikolayevsky (Николаевский)
Towns under the district's jurisdiction:
Nikolayevsk (Николаевск)
with 12 selsovets under the district's jurisdiction.
Novoanninsky (Новоаннинский)
Towns under the district's jurisdiction:
Novoanninsky (Новоаннинский)
with 13 selsovets under the district's jurisdiction.
Novonikolayevsky (Новониколаевский)
Urban-type settlements under the district's jurisdiction:
Novonikolayevsky (Новониколаевский)
with 10 selsovets under the district's jurisdiction.
Oktyabrsky (Октябрьский)
Urban-type settlements under the district's jurisdiction:
Oktyabrsky (Октябрьский)
with 15 selsovets under the district's jurisdiction.
Olkhovsky (Ольховский)
with 14 selsovets under the district's jurisdiction.
Pallasovsky (Палласовский)
Towns under the district's jurisdiction:
Pallasovka (Палласовка)
with 12 selsovets under the district's jurisdiction.
Rudnyansky (Руднянский)
Urban-type settlements under the district's jurisdiction:
Rudnya (Рудня)
with 9 selsovets under the district's jurisdiction.
Serafimovichsky (Серафимовичский)
Towns under the district's jurisdiction:
Serafimovich (Серафимович)
with 15 selsovets under the district's jurisdiction.
Sredneakhtubinsky (Среднеахтубинский)
Towns under the district's jurisdiction:
Krasnoslobodsk (Краснослободск)
Urban-type settlements under the district's jurisdiction:
Srednyaya Akhtuba (Средняя Ахтуба)
with 9 selsovets under the district's jurisdiction.
Staropoltavsky (Старополтавский)
with 18 selsovets under the district's jurisdiction.
Surovikinsky (Суровикинский)
Towns under the district's jurisdiction:
Surovikino (Суровикино)
with 13 selsovets under the district's jurisdiction.
Svetloyarsky (Светлоярский)
Urban-type settlements under the district's jurisdiction:
Svetly Yar (Светлый Яр)
with 9 selsovets under the district's jurisdiction.
Uryupinsky (Урюпинский)
with 23 selsovets under the district's jurisdiction.
Yelansky (Еланский)
Urban-type settlements under the district's jurisdiction:
Yelan (Елань)
with 20 selsovets under the district's jurisdiction.
Zhirnovsky (Жирновский)
Towns under the district's jurisdiction:
Zhirnovsk (Жирновск)
Urban-type settlements under the district's jurisdiction:
Krasny Yar (Красный Яр)
Linyovo (Линёво)
Medveditsky (Медведицкий)
with 11 selsovets under the district's jurisdiction.

References

Notes

Sources
 

Geography of Volgograd Oblast
Volgograd Oblast